Lactuca perennis, common names: mountain lettuce, blue lettuce or perennial lettuce, is a perennial herbaceous plant species belonging to the genus Lactuca of the family Asteraceae. It is widespread across most of central and southern Europe.  Its leaves are edible.

Description
This plant is glabrous, the stems is erect and branched, leaves are greyish-green, the lower ones with a small petioles,  the upper ones partly amplexicaul. It is hermaphrodite and entomophilous. The flowering period extends from April through August and the seeds ripen from July until September.

In southern France it is sometimes referred to by its Occitan name “breou” or “breu”

Habitat
These plants prefer calcareous well-drained soils and they are common on sunny rocky soils, on dry meadows,  on roadsides and on banks of rivers.

References

External links
 
 Biolib
 Czech Botany
 Zipcode Zoo, Lactuca
 Lactuca perennis Plants for a Future 

perennis
Flora of Europe
Plants described in 1753
Taxa named by Carl Linnaeus